Giacomo Quagliata (born 19 February 2000) is an Italian professional footballer who plays as a left back for  club Cremonese .

Career
Quagliata made his professional debut with Pro Vercelli in a 5–1 Coppa Italia loss to Ascoli on 10 August 2020. In January 2020, he joined Heracles Almelo in the Dutch Eredivisie.

In July 2022, Quagliata returned to Italy and signed with Cremonese.

References

External links
 
 

2000 births
Living people
People from Vlaardingen
Italian footballers
Italy under-21 international footballers
Italian expatriate footballers
Association football midfielders
Serie A players
Serie C players
Serie D players
Eredivisie players
F.C. Pro Vercelli 1892 players
Latina Calcio 1932 players
S.S.C. Bari players
Heracles Almelo players
U.S. Cremonese players
Italian expatriate sportspeople in the Netherlands
Expatriate footballers in the Netherlands
Footballers from South Holland